Kismayo (Maay: Kismanyy, ;) is a port city in the southern Lower Juba (Jubbada Hoose) province of Somalia. It is the commercial capital of the autonomous Jubaland region.

According to the United Nations Development Programme, the city of Kismayo had a population of around 89,333 in 2005.

During the Middle Ages, Kismayo and its surrounding area was part of the Ajuran Empire that governed much of southern Somalia and eastern Ethiopia, with its domain extending from Hobyo in the north, to Qelafo in the west, to Kismayo in the south.

In the early modern period, Kismayo was ruled by the Geledi Sultanate and by the later 1800s, the Boqow dynasty. The kingdom was eventually incorporated into Italian Somaliland in 1910 after the death of the last sultan, Osman Ahmed. After independence in 1960, the city was made the center of the official Kismayo District.

Kismayo was the site of numerous battles during the civil war, from the early 1990s. In late 2006, Islamist militants gained control of most of the city. To reclaim possession of the territory, a new autonomous regional administration dubbed Azania was announced in 2010 and formalized in 2011. In September 2012, the Somali National Army and AMISOM troops re-captured the city from the Al-Shabaab insurgents. The Juba Interim Administration was subsequently officially established and recognized in 2013.

History

Antiquity
During antiquity. Kismayo was part of the Somali city-states that in engaged in a lucrative trade network connecting Somali merchants with Phoenicia, Ptolemic Egypt, Greece, Parthian Persia, Saba, Nabataea and the Roman Empire. Somali sailors used the ancient Somali maritime vessel known as the beden to transport their cargo.

Middle Ages and the early modern period

The Kismayo area was originally a small fishing settlement.

During the Middle Ages, the region came under the rule of the influential Ajuran Sultanate, which utilized the Jubba River for its plantations.

After the collapse of this polity, the House of Gobroon was established and the Sultanate of the Geledi held sway over the area. The dynasty reached its apex under the successive reigns of Sultan Yusuf Mahamud Ibrahim, who successfully consolidated Gobroon power during the Bardera wars, and Sultan Ahmed Yusuf, who forced regional powers such as the Omani Empire to submit tribute.

Darod Invasion
Kismayo was the heart of the Orma land but the 19th century saw a large number of Ogadenis, along with their Marexan allies invading the Jubba Coast. During the early 19th century the Ogadenis were first in contact with the Borona, and advanced through Lugh during the reign of Gada Sakko Dadacha Gemeda. In 1842 the Ogaden advanced through the Dawa (Daya) River and entered Borona/Orma territory as clients (Shegats).  The tactic of the Darood tribes when entering a new territory was to enter as respective clients and members of the communities who were already living there. This meant meant the Darod were allowed to have there own (Cattle,Camels etc). These "clients" slowly became larger in number and were able to overthrow the Wardey  due to a small pox disease which they brought to them. By 1865 thousands of Wardeys had been killed by the disease. In 1867 the Somalis had called the Wardey for a gathering the Wardey as expected showed up, this was a trap set by the Somali the unprepared Warfey elders were slaughtered by there former Somali clients. According to Lewis the Somali forcers had defeated the Wardey because they had Better weapons, used horses, were larger in numbers, and that the main body of the Orma was elsewhere. the Somalis had also received assistance by the British Kenya.

Colonial Era 
Jubaland became part of the British East Africa colony and was later transferred to Italian Somaliland

The Italians subsequently referred to the city as Chisimaio. Kismayo and the northern half of the Jubaland region were then incorporated into neighboring Italian Somaliland on 30 June 1926. The colony had a total area of 87,000 km2 (33,000 sq mi), with a population of 120,000 inhabitants. Britain retained control of the southern half of the partitioned Jubaland territory, which was later called the Northern Frontier District (NFD).

Somali Civil War

Following the breakdown of central authority that accompanied the civil war in 1991, various local militias fought for control of the city, including supporters of Mohammed Said Hersi ("General Morgan"), and Col. Barre Adan Shire Hiiraale Somali National Front (SNF), later on known as the Juba Valley Alliance (JVA). As well of Col. Omar Jess' Somali Patriotic Movement (SPM). Aid worker Sean Devereux was assassinated in the city in January 1993. In March 1993, a United States Marine amphibious group arrived in the city in an attempt to keep the peace as part of the United Nations intervention in Somalia. By December 1993, General Morgan's troops controlled Kismayo, despite the presence of peacekeepers. The last UN troops left the city in December 1994.

General Morgan briefly declared Jubaland independent on September 3, 1998. Political opponents of his subsequently united as the Allied Somali Forces (ASF), seizing control of Kismayo by June of the following year. Led by Colonel Barre Adan Shire Hiiraale, the ASF administration renamed itself the Juba Valley Alliance in 2001. On June 18 of that year, an 11-member interclan council decided to ally the JVA with the newly forming Transitional Federal Government.

In 2006 the Islamic Courts Union (ICU), an Islamist organization, fought with Jubaland's inhabitants of the state the Darod Marehan (JVA). And invaded other parts of southern Somalia and promptly imposed Shari'a law. The Transitional Federal Government sought to re‑establish its authority, and, with the assistance of Ethiopian troops, African Union peacekeepers and air support by the United States, managed to drive out the rival ICU and solidify its rule.

On January 8, 2007, as the Battle of Ras Kamboni raged just south of Kismayo, the TFG relocated from its interim location in Baidoa to the nation's capital, Mogadishu. This marked the first time since the fall of the Siad Barre regime in 1991 that the federal government controlled most of the country.

Following this defeat, the Islamic Courts Union splintered into several different factions. Some of the more radical elements, including Al-Shabaab, regrouped to continue their insurgency against the TFG and oppose the Ethiopian military's presence in Somalia. Throughout 2007 and 2008, Al‑Shabaab scored military victories, seizing control of key towns and ports in both central and southern Somalia. By January 2009, Al‑Shabaab and other militias had managed to force the Ethiopian troops to retreat, leaving behind an under-equipped African Union peacekeeping force to assist the Transitional Federal Government's troops.

In September 2012, Somali Army, Ras Kamboni militiamen and Kenyan Defense Forces (KDF), all under command of the African Union Mission in Somalia AMISOM, re-captured the city from the Al-Shabaab insurgents during the Battle of Kismayo (2012). This was a culmination to the Kenyan Operation Linda Nchi attack into Somalia which had begun late the year before.

On 12 July 2019, a car bomb and a gun attack at the Asasey hotel killed at least 26, including two prominent journalists and nine foreigners. Islamist group al-Shabab claimed responsibility.

Geography

Location
Kismayo is located in the fertile Juba Valley in southeastern Somalia, on the Somali Sea coast. Nearby settlements include to the northeast Xamareyso (5.0 nm), to the north Dalxiiska (1.3 nm), to the northwest Qeyla Dheere (6.4 nm), to the west Saamogia (0.9 nm), to the southwest Iach Bulle (10.0 nm), and to the south Qandal (6.5 nm). The largest cities in the country most proximate to Kismayo are Jamaame (52 km), Jilib (97 km), and Merca (337 km).

Climate
Weather is hot year-round, with seasonal monsoon winds and irregular rainfall with recurring droughts. The gu rains, also known as the Southwest Monsoons, begin in April and last until July producing significant fresh water and allowing lush vegetation to grow. The gu season is followed by the xagaa (hagaa) dry season.

Government 
A new municipal district administration was established on 6 September 2008. Its members reportedly represented the ICU and Al‑Shabaab (three members each) in addition to a local clan (one member) which had played a part in the military assault. Representatives of the Islamic Courts Union questioned the legitimacy of the authority. On 1 October 2009, Al Shabaab took full control of the city, after Col. Barre Adan Shire Hiiraale self proclaim President of the (JVA) Jubaland state. And Sheikh Ahmed Madobe, a senior commander of Ras Kamboni Brigade (then a part of Hizbul Islam), challenged Al‑Shabaab's control.

With the subsequent ouster of the Al-Shabaab rebels in September 2012, the Somali government began preparing mediations between the city's various stakeholders in order to establish an inclusive local administration. On 28 August 2013, the autonomous Jubaland administration signed a national reconciliation agreement in Addis Ababa with the federal government. Endorsed by the federal State Minister for the Presidency Farah Abdulkadir on behalf of President Hassan Sheikh Mohamud, the pact was brokered by the Foreign Ministry of Ethiopia and came after protracted bilateral talks.
 
Under the terms of the agreement, Jubaland is administered for a two-year period by a Juba Interim Administration and led by the region's incumbent president, Ahmed Mohamed Islam. The regional president serves as the chairperson of a new Executive Council, to which he appoints three deputies. Additionally, the agreement includes the integration of Jubaland's military forces under the central command of the Somali National Army (SNA), and stipulates that the Juba Interim Administration will command the regional police.

Districts 
Kismayo is divided into 4 districts, or degmo (see map):
Calanley
Farjano
Shaqaalaha
Fanoole

Demographics 
, Kismayo has an estimated population of 89,333 residents.

The city is inhibited by ethnic Somalis, mainly of the Darod clan family, including Ogaden and Marehan.

Education 

Institutions of higher learning in the city include Kismayo University (KU). Established in August 2005, it is situated about 1 km north, along the Kismayo–Mogadishu main road.

Economy 
Kismayo is the market center and commercial hub autonomous of the Jubbaland region. Banks with a presence in Kismayo include Salama bank and many other money remittance business.

In October 2008, the daily labor rate was estimated at 157,500 Somali shillings (approximately $4.50), up from 52,000 shillings (approximately $2.21) in January 2008, while kilogram of red rice rose from 14,170 (approximately $0.61) to 46,000 (approximately $1.31). A liter of diesel cost 43,000 shillings (approximately $1.23) and a camel costs over 15 million shillings (approximately $435). Total cereal production as of 2008 was estimated to be 780MT.

Transportation

Airport

Kismayo's air transportation needs are served by Kismayo Airport, which is situated about 10 km from the city. It was formerly a Somali Air Force training base. Following the outbreak of the civil war, the airport was closed down for a period of time and its infrastructure was significantly damaged. However, the facility was reopened in October 2008 by the Islamic Courts Union after undergoing some renovations. That same year, the airport was also renamed after Imam Ahmed Gurey, a 16th‑century Somali military leader.

The Kismayo Airport was officially brought under the Juba Interim Administration in August 2013. Per agreement, management of the facility was scheduled to be transferred to the Federal Government after a period of six months. Revenues and resources generated from the airport will also be earmarked for Jubaland's service delivery and security sectors as well as local institutional development.

Roads
Three main thoroughfares connect Kismayo to other major areas in the country. The 600 km Highway 3 runs the length of the Juba Valley. Starting in Beled Hawo, it goes through Garbaharey, Bardera and Buale before finally reaching Kismayo.

A paved 528 km freeway links the capital Mogadishu with Kismayo, passing through Jilib before turning towards the capital. A third highway extends northwest from Kismayo to Afmadow, then turns toward Dhobley in the eastern part of the Gedo region.

In January 2015, the Interim Juba Administration launched a transport beautification and cleaning campaign in Kismayo. Part of a broader urbanization drive, the initiative includes the clearing of clogged streets and lanes, razing of illegal buildings therein, and further development of the municipal road network.

Seaport
Kismayo's large docks are situated on a peninsula on the Somali Sea coast. Formerly one of the Bajuni Islands, the peninsula was connected by a narrow causeway when the modern Port of Kismayo was built in 1964 with U.S. assistance. The port served as a base for the Somali Navy as well as the Soviet Navy after the 1969 military coup. In 1984, Somalia and the United States jointly refurbished the port after significant wear to the  four-berth, marginal wharf made major renovations necessary.

The Port of Kismayo was officially brought under the Juba Interim Administration in August 2013. According to the agreement, management of the facility was scheduled to be transferred to the Somali Federal Government after a period of six months. Like Kismayo Airport, revenues and resources generated by the seaport are to be earmarked for Jubaland's service delivery and security sectors as well as local institutional development.

Notable residents 

Mohamed Ibrahim Liqliiqato, military and political leader; ambassador to the Soviet Union and West Germany; Speaker of Parliament (1983–1990)
Abdullahi Ahmed Irro, general in the Somali National Army
Hussein Samatar, politician, banker and community organizer

See also 
 Fall of Kismayo

References 

 Kismayo, Somalia

External links 

 WorldStaesmen – Somalia – Jubaland
 1992 Map of Kismayu

 
Populated places in Lower Juba
Populated coastal places in Somalia
Ajuran Sultanate
Cities in Somalia